Thomas Angell (c.1616–1694) was one of the four men who wintered with Roger Williams at Seekonk, Plymouth Colony in early 1636, and then joined him in founding the settlement of Providence Plantation in what became the Colony of Rhode Island and Providence Plantations.  He was a minor at the time of his arrival, but his name appears on several of the early documents related to the settlement of Providence.  In the early 1650s, he became active in the affairs of the town, serving as commissioner, juryman, and constable.  In 1658, he began his service as the Providence Town Clerk and held this position for 17 years.  He wrote his will in 1685, dying almost a decade later in 1694, leaving a widow and many grown children.  Angell Street on Providence's East Side is named for him.

Life 

Thomas Angell was one of the four men who spent the winter of 1636 with Roger Williams at Seekonk in the Plymouth Colony (later Rehoboth, Massachusetts). They established the settlement of Providence Plantation in the late spring on the upper reaches of the Narragansett Bay.  Angell was a minor at the time, but the adult men in the group brought their wives and children with them.

After reaching legal age, he and 12 other men signed a civil compact dated 20 August 1637, desiring civil equality with older men in the town.  On 27 July 1640, he was one of 39 inhabitants of Providence who signed a document for a form of government; he signed by mark.

In 1652, Angell became involved in civic affairs when he was selected as a commissioner, and he was a juryman in 1655 and also served as constable.  Also in 1655, his name appears on a list of freemen within the colony.  Angell's greatest service to the town began in 1658, when he became the Providence Town Clerk, and he served in this capacity for 17 years until 1675, just prior to King Philip's War.  His name last appears on a public record in 1685 when he and his son James were taxed.  He wrote his will in May 1685 but he lived until 1694, when his will was proved in September of that year.

Family 

Angell married Alice Ashton, the daughter of James Ashton of Saint Albans in Hertfordshire, England.  Alice's sister Mary married Thomas Olney, another Providence settler, and her brother James also came to New England.  Thomas and Alice had eight children.  Their daughter Alice married Eleazer Whipple, the son of John and Sarah Whipple and brother of Colonel Joseph Whipple, and their daughter Margaret married Jonathan, another son of John and Sarah Whipple.  Their son James married Abigail Dexter, the daughter of colonial President Gregory Dexter. His descendant James Burrill Angell was the president of the University of Vermont and the University of Michigan, as well as an ambassador to China and Turkey.

See also

 List of early settlers of Rhode Island
 Colony of Rhode Island and Providence Plantations

References

Bibliography

External links
Rhode Island History from the State of Rhode Island General Assembly website.  See Chapter 2, Colonial Era.

1618 births
1694 deaths
Immigrants to Plymouth Colony
People from Providence, Rhode Island
People of colonial Rhode Island